Robert George Weigandt (February 5, 1914 – February 26, 2008) was an American professional basketball player and college coach. He played for the Oshkosh All-Stars of the National Basketball League in just one game during the 1938–39 season.

Weigandt then served in the U.S. Navy during World War II. When he returned, he coached basketball, golf, tennis, and football at the University of Wisconsin–Whitewater before retiring in 1980.

References

1914 births
2008 deaths
American men's basketball players
United States Navy personnel of World War II
Basketball coaches from Wisconsin
Basketball players from Wisconsin
College golf coaches in the United States
College tennis coaches in the United States
Guards (basketball)
High school basketball coaches in Wisconsin
High school football coaches in Wisconsin
Military personnel from Wisconsin
Oshkosh All-Stars players
Sportspeople from Oshkosh, Wisconsin
University of Wisconsin–Whitewater faculty
Wisconsin Badgers football players
Wisconsin Badgers men's basketball players
Wisconsin–Whitewater Warhawks football coaches
Wisconsin–Whitewater Warhawks men's basketball coaches